Mach: The First Colony is a role-playing game published by Alliance Publications in 1983.

Description
Mach: The First Colony is a science-fiction system in which the player characters are mercenaries on a frontier planet. The planet, its societies, and mixed technologies are described in detail. The first book (32 pages) covers character creation and combat; the second (32 pages) covers skills and creatures. The game includes an introductory scenario (16 pages).

Publication history
Mach: The First Colony was designed by Michael Lange with Martin Miller, and published by Alliance Publications in 1983 as a boxed set containing a 32-page book, a 32-page book, and a 16-page book.

Reception
William A. Barton reviewed Mach - The First Colony in Space Gamer No. 69. Barton commented that "Those players who like complex, highly detailed games – players of systems such as Space Opera, Chivalry & Sorcery, and Aftermath – might find Mach worth its [...] price. Admirers of simpler systems, such as The Fantasy Trip, Star Trek or Call of Cthulhu, should probably pass this one up."

References

Role-playing games introduced in 1983
Science fiction role-playing games